The 1908–09 season was the 36th season of competitive football in Scotland and the 19th season of the Scottish Football League.

League competitions

Scottish League Division One 

Champions: Celtic

Scottish League Division Two

Other honours

Cup honours

National

County

Non-league honours

Senior 
Highland League

Other Leagues

Edinburgh Exhibition 

An invitational football tournament was held at the Exhibition Sports Grounds, Saughton, Edinburgh in August 1908, as part of the Scottish National Exhibition event being held there during that summer. There was a tournament for junior teams from the Lothians held in association with the exhibition.

Scotland national team 

Key:
 (H) = Home match
 (A) = Away match
 BHC = British Home Championship

Other national teams

Scottish League XI

Notes

See also

 Edinburgh Exhibition Cup
 1908–09 Aberdeen F.C. season
 1908–09 Celtic F.C. season
 1908–09 Dumbarton F.C. season
 1908–09 Dundee F.C. season
 1908–09 Heart of Midlothian F.C. season
 1908–09 Hibernian F.C. season
 1908–09 Rangers F.C. season

References

External links
Scottish Football Historical Archive

 
Seasons in Scottish football